Chechil or chechili is an Armenian brined string cheese, popular in Armenia and Georgia. It has a consistency approximating that of mozzarella or sulguni and is produced in the form of dense strings, rolled up in a figure eight of thick braid-shaped ropes. Chechil is a smoked, braided, salty, string-cheese beer snack that is enjoyed by beer drinkers and enthusiasts across the globe. Chechil is made from pasteurized cow milk and is low in fat. Its taste is salty, very chewy, and with a smoky flavor to it. Its consistency is firm and smooth.

Chechil is one of the cheeses produced in the Armenian Highlands and is also called husats or tel. It is a kneaded or pulled cheese, and the art of the cheese-maker is in stretching it thin so that it yields a "chicken-breast texture". The cheese is often sold braided in thick ropes. Curd is given a hot whey bath, then kneaded and stretched to the desirable, pliable consistency. In the Western world, chechil panir is often called Armenian string cheese. Armenian refugees who settled in Syria after the Armenian genocide of 1915 introduced it in the country. In Turkey, chechil is called çeçil or tel peyniri, and is widely popular being specifically produced in Erzurum and in Ardahan. In Russia, it is very popular as a pairing to beer in bars. It is also popular in Central Asia and Eastern Europe. Chechil is also produced in the USA under the name Chechil, rather than Chechili. In the UK, Meskhuri Chechili is a "protected geographical indication" by agreement between the UK and Georgian governments.

Chechil is matured in brine and often smoked before consumption. It is sometimes mixed with farmer cheese or various hard cheeses, and is stored in jars or wine skins.

Nutrient content:
 Fat — 5–10%
 Water — 58–60%
 Salt — 4–8%

Because of its low fat content, chechil is often considered and used as diet food.

See also

 Brined cheese
 List of cheeses
 List of smoked foods
 List of stretch-cured cheeses

References

External links

Brined cheeses
Smoked cheeses
Stretched-curd cheeses
Armenian cuisine
Turkish cheeses